The following is the final results of the 1989 World Weightlifting Championships. Men's competition were held in Athens, Greece and Women's competition were held in Manchester, United Kingdom.

Medal summary

Men

Women

Medal table
Ranking by Big (Total result) medals 

Ranking by all medals: Big (Total result) and Small (Snatch and Clean & Jerk)

References
Results (Sport 123)
Weightlifting World Championships Seniors Statistics

External links
Database

W
World Weightlifting Championships
World Weightlifting Championships
International weightlifting competitions hosted by Greece